Lyakhe is a rural locality (a selo) in Guriksky Selsoviet, Tabasaransky District, Republic of Dagestan, Russia. The population was 244 as of 2010. There are 2 streets.

Geography 
Lyakhe is located 15 km southeast of Khuchni (the district's administrative centre) by road. Firgil is the nearest rural locality.

References 

Rural localities in Tabasaransky District